The American Journal of Comparative Law (AJCL) is a quarterly, peer-reviewed law journal devoted to comparative and transnational legal studies—including, among other subjects, comparative law, comparative and transnational legal history and theory, private international law and conflict of laws, and the study of legal systems, cultures, and traditions other than those of the United States. In its long and rich history, the AJCL has published articles authored by scholars representing all continents, regions, and legal cultures of the world. It is published by Oxford University Press on behalf of the American Society of Comparative Law. As of 2014, it is co-hosted and administered by the Institute of Comparative Law (McGill University) and the Georgetown University Law Center. It has been hosted in the past by institutions such as University of California, Berkeley  School of Law, Columbia Law School, and the University of Michigan Law School. The current Editors-in-Chief are Georgetown University Law Center’s Franz Werro, and McGill University's Helge Dedek.

Executive Editorial Board 

Since 2014, Helge Dedek (McGill University) and Franz Werro (Georgetown University) have served as the Editors-in-Chief of the AJCL. Former Editors-in-Chief include Hessel E. Yntema (1952–1966), B.J. George (1966–1968), Alfred F. Conard (1968–1970), John G. Fleming (1971–1987), Richard M. Buxbaum (1987–2003), George Bermann (2003–2006), James Gordley (2003–2008), Mathias W. Reimann (2003–2013), and James V. Feinerman (2014–2015).

The Executive Editorial Board of the AJCL is made up of the following people:

Luisa Antoniolli, University of Trento Faculty of Law; Gary F. Bell, National University of Singapore Faculty of Law; Francesca Bignami, George Washington University Law School; Mauro Bussani, University of Trieste Law Department; Donald C. Clarke, George Washington University Law School; Dominique Custos, University of Caen Law School; Tom Ginsburg, University of Chicago Law School; Simone Glanert, University of Kent Law School; Hoi Kong, McGill University Faculty of Law; Máximo Langer, UCLA School of Law; Ralf Michaels, Duke University School of Law; Sherally Munshi, Georgetown University Law Center; Álvaro Santos, Georgetown University Law Center; Walter Stoffel, University of Fribourg Faculty of Law; and Symeon C. Symeonides, Willamette University College of Law.

The Journal has two Book Review Editors: Richard Albert, Boston College Law School; and Paul R. Dubinsky, Wayne State University Law School. Beginning January 1, 2019, Professor Dubinsky has stepped down from his position as Book Review Editor; he is replaced by Professor Joshua Karton of Queen's University, Faculty of Law.

Ranking and impact factor 
The 2019 Israeli Inter-University Committee Report, which "offers a global ranking of academic legal publications, covering more than 900 outlets, and using a four-tier categorization...based on a combined quantitative and qualitative methodology," placed the American Journal of Comparative Law in its highest tier (A*). Of the 908 journals evaluated, only 39 received an A* designation. "Peer-reviewed journals were ranked primarily on the basis of well-known databases that are used to assess peer-reviewed journals in many other
disciplines. The Committee relied on up-to-date data from the following databases: SCImago Journal Rankings (SJR), CiteScore, and Web of Science (JCR). For example, because the two highest categories (A* and A) comprise one fifth of ranked journals, one of the main criteria for including a peer-reviewed journal in these categories was it being classified as a first-quartile (Q1) journal in the leading databases (e.g., SJR or CiteScore). The strongest among Q1 journals were included in A*, and the weakest (roughly
5%) were considered for B."

According to Thomas Reuters Journal Citation Reports, the AJCL's impact factor (IF) was 1.327 in 2016, and it was ranked 42nd of 147 journals in the Law category. The AJCL saw a drop in its impact factor in 2017, falling to 110 of 147 journals, with an IF of 0.58. According to the Washington and Lee University School of Law rankings, the Journal is ranked first in the comparative law category (out of thirty-six journals), with a combined score of 100 and an impact factor of 0.85.

See also
Annual Bulletin of the Comparative Law Bureau (American Bar Association: 1908–1914, 1933), the first comparative law journal in the U.S.
American Society of Comparative Law

References

External links

American law journals
Comparative law journals
Quarterly journals
Peer reviewed law journals